Olga Vladimirovna Belyakova (born 26 September 1988 in Rybinsk) is a Russian short-track speed-skater.

Belyakova competed at the 2010 Winter Olympics for Russia. She finished sixth in the first round of the 1500 metres, failing to advance, and ending up 30th overall.

As of 2013, Belyakova's best finish at the World Championships is fourth, in the 1500 metres in 2012. She has also won a silver medal as a member of the Russian relay team at the 2010 European Championships.

As of 2013, Belyakova has two ISU Short Track Speed Skating World Cup podium finishes, both of which came as a member of the Russian relay team. Her best finish is a silver medal, at Heerenveen in 2006–07. Her top World Cup ranking is 13th, in the 1500 metres in 2006–07.

World Cup Podiums

References

1988 births
Living people
Russian female short track speed skaters
Olympic short track speed skaters of Russia
Short track speed skaters at the 2010 Winter Olympics
Short track speed skaters at the 2014 Winter Olympics
People from Rybinsk
Sportspeople from Yaroslavl Oblast
21st-century Russian women